Uzal Girard Ent CBE (March 3, 1900 – March 5, 1948) was an American Army Air Forces officer who served as the commander of the Second Air Force during World War II.

Biography 

Ent was born on March 3, 1900, in Northumberland, Pennsylvania. He served in the infantry from 1917 to 1919, and was commissioned into the US Air Service from West Point in 1924. In 1927, he married Eleanor Marwitz with whom he would have a son named Girard.

On May 30, 1928 he was the co-pilot of a balloon in the National Balloon Race starting at Bettis Field in Pittsburgh, Pennsylvania. During the race, Ent's balloon was struck by lightning over Youngstown, Pennsylvania. The lightning strike killed the pilot and set the balloon's hydrogen filled envelope on fire. Ent could have parachuted to safety but, instead, chose to stay with the balloon, attempted to rescue the pilot and successfully piloted the balloon to the ground. For this act of heroism, Ent was awarded the Distinguished Flying Cross later that year.

After graduating from the Command and General Staff College in 1938 he served as a military attaché at the American Embassy, Lima, Peru from July 1939 until October 1942, acting as the senior neutral military observer on the Peruvian side after their boundary war with Ecuador.

He was Chief of Staff to the U.S. Army Forces in the Middle East from October 1942 until February 1943. He then served as Commanding General, 9th Bomber Command, 9th Air Force from February to December 1943, and led 178 B-24s in "Operation Tidal Wave" – the bombing raid on the oil fields at Ploieşti, Romania, on August 1, 1943 – before being appointed Chief of Staff and then Commanding General, 2nd Air Force, based at Colorado Springs, Colorado. In September 1944, it was General Ent who selected Lieutenant Colonel Paul Tibbets to put together an organisation and train them to drop atomic weapons from B-29 bombers. Given Tibbets and two other names by General Arnold, General Ent replied without hesitation, "Paul Tibbets is the man to do it."

In October 1944, Ent was seriously injured in the crash of a B-25 on takeoff at the Fort Worth Army Airfield, Texas. Paralyzed from the waist down he learned to walk again using braces.
He retired for "disability in line of duty" in 1946, with the rank of major general. After his retirement from military service, he studied to have a future career in law and experimented materials to develop lightweight braces for paraplegics. He was author of the book What’s My Score?, which provided aid to victims of paralysis. He also volunteered for several experimental surgeries in order for surgeons to learn on how to better treat spinal injuries.

He died at Fitzsimons General Hospital in Aurora, Colorado, on March 5, 1948, due to complications from the injuries he sustained in the plane crash. He was cremated and his ashes were scattered over the Riverview Cemetery in his hometown of Northumberland, where a cenotaph honoring him is also located.

Awards and honors

United States

 Cheney Award

Foreign

Other honors
In 1951, an Air Force base opened near Colorado Springs, Colorado, and was named in the general's honor. Ent Air Force Base was the initial home to the North American Air Defense Command (NORAD) from 1957 until 1963 when the command center moved to a highly secure facility within Cheyenne Mountain. Ent AFB then became the Ent Annex to the Cheyenne Mountain Complex in 1975, and the facility was subsequently closed in 1976.

The Ent Credit Union was named in his honor. Veterans of Foreign Wars (VFW) Post 8298 in Ent's hometown of Northumberland, Pennsylvania, is named "Major General Uzal G. Ent" to honor his memory.

References

External links
 Ent Credit Union
 Ent Credit Union – History
 Uzal Girard Ent's obituary in Time Magazine
 Official USAF biography of Maj Gen Ent
 Uzal Girard Ent (Find A Grave)

1900 births
1948 deaths
United States Army Air Forces generals
Air Corps Tactical School alumni
Recipients of the Air Medal
Recipients of the Distinguished Service Cross (United States)
Recipients of the Distinguished Flying Cross (United States)
Recipients of the Legion of Merit
People from Northumberland, Pennsylvania
United States Army Air Forces generals of World War II
Military personnel from Pennsylvania
Recipients of the Distinguished Service Medal (US Army)
Commanders of the Order of the British Empire
United States Military Academy alumni
Aviators from Pennsylvania
United States air attachés
American expatriates in Peru
Survivors of aviation accidents or incidents